João Carlos Dias Correia (born 23 July 1985 in Espinho, Aveiro District), known as Carlitos, is a Portuguese professional footballer who plays for F.C. Cesarense as a forward.

His professional input consisted of 138 matches and 16 goals in the Segunda Liga, where he arrived at the age of 27 and where he represented solely U.D. Oliveirense.

References

External links

1985 births
Living people
People from Espinho, Portugal
Sportspeople from Aveiro District
Portuguese footballers
Association football forwards
Liga Portugal 2 players
Segunda Divisão players
S.C. Espinho players
F.C. Arouca players
U.D. Oliveirense players